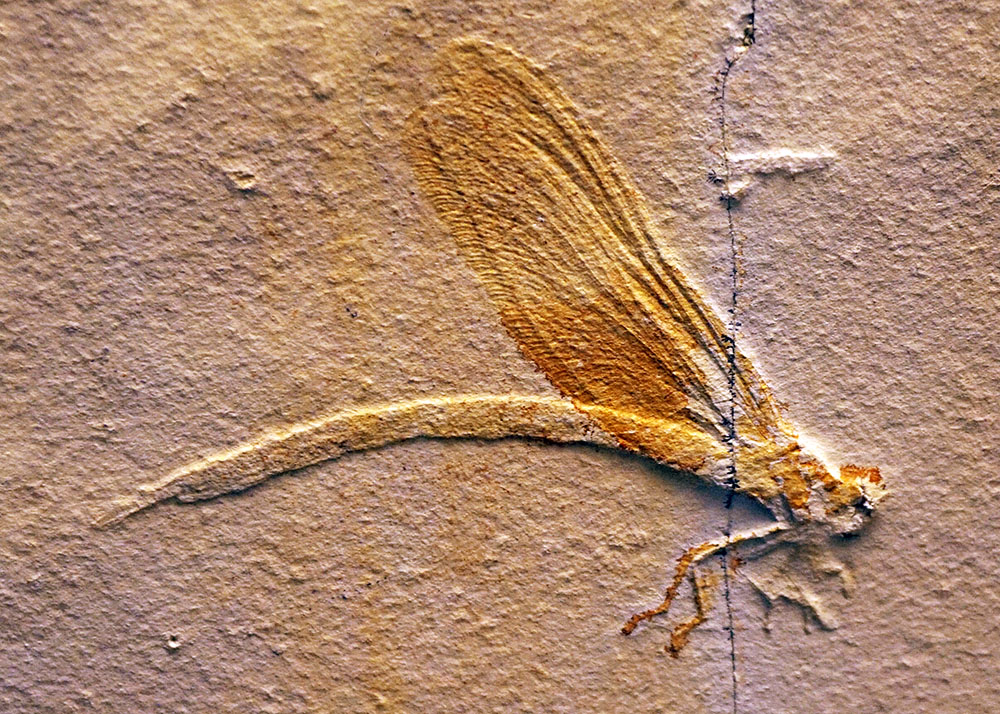
- Isophlebia aspasia fossil, Augsburg Naturmuseum

Scientific classification
- Kingdom: Animalia
- Phylum: Arthropoda
- Clade: Pancrustacea
- Class: Insecta
- Order: Odonata
- Family: †Isophlebiidae
- Genus: †Isophlebia; Hagen, 1866

Type species
- †Isophlebia aspasia Hagen, 1866

= Isophlebia =

Isophlebia Temporal range: 150.8–145.5 Ma

Extinct genus of insects

Isophlebia is an extinct genus of fossil odonates belonging to the family Isophlebiidae.

These fast-moving volant carnivore-insectivores lived during the Jurassic period of Germany, from 150.8 to 145.5 Ma.

== Species ==
- †Isophlebia aspasia Hagen, 1866
